The 1845 United States Senate special election in Pennsylvania was held on March 13, 1845. Simon Cameron was elected by the Pennsylvania General Assembly to the United States Senate.

Background
Democrat and future President of the United States James Buchanan was elected to the United States Senate by the Pennsylvania General Assembly, consisting of the House of Representatives and the Senate, in an 1834 special election and was re-elected in 1836 and 1843. Sen. Buchanan resigned on March 5, 1845, after being appointed U.S. Secretary of State by President James K. Polk.

Results
Following the resignation of Sen. Buchanan, the Pennsylvania General Assembly convened on March 13, 1845, to elect a new Senator to fill the vacancy and serve the remainder of the term set to expire on March 4, 1849. Five ballots were recorded. The results of the fifth and final ballot of both houses combined are as follows:

|-
|-bgcolor="#EEEEEE"
| colspan="3" align="right" | Totals
| align="right" | 133
| align="right" | 100.00%
|}

See also 
 United States Senate elections, 1844 and 1845
 United States Senate election in Pennsylvania, 1845

References

External links
Pennsylvania Election Statistics: 1682-2006 from the Wilkes University Election Statistics Project

Pennsylvania special
1845 special
Pennsylvania 1845 special
United States Senate 1845 special
United States Senate special
Pennsylvania 1845